District 9 is an electoral district in Malta.  It was established in 1962. Its boundaries have changed many times but it currently consists of the localities of Għargħur, Msida, San Ġwann, Swieqi and Ta' Xbiex.

Representatives

References 

 

Districts of Malta